Sheed and Ward was a publishing house founded in London in 1926 by Catholic activists Frank Sheed and Maisie Ward. The head office was moved to New York in 1933.

The United States assets of Sheed and Ward have been owned by Rowman & Littlefield since 2002, and those in the United Kingdom are owned by Bloomsbury Publishing.

History
Sheed and Ward published a number of major Roman Catholic authors of the 1920s through to the mid-twentieth century, including G. K. Chesterton, Hilaire Belloc, Christopher Dawson, Vincent McNabb, Leo J. Trese, Ronald Knox and Etienne Gilson.

In the early 1930s Sheed and Ward operated the Catholic Book a Month Club.

In 1973, Sheed and Ward was acquired by the Universal Press Syndicate; the company was used as the base of the publisher Andrews McMeel. However, the Sheed and Ward name and backlist were later divested.

The company was owned by the National Catholic Reporter from 1986 to 1998, when it was sold to the Priests of the Sacred Heart. The United States assets were acquired by Rowman & Littlefield in 2002, and the United Kingdom assets by the Continuum International Publishing Group, which has since been subsumed into Bloomsbury Publishing.

The company archives of the New York office from 1933 to 1977 are kept at the University of Notre Dame.

Book series

References

Further reading
 Wilfrid Sheed, Frank and Maisie: A Memoir of Parents, New York: Simon & Schuster, 1985.

External links
 Sheed, Wilfred. "The Good Word", The New York Times, April 2, 1972

Book publishing companies of the United Kingdom
Book publishing companies based in New York (state)
Publishing companies established in 1926
British companies established in 1926
Publishing companies disestablished in 1973
1973 disestablishments in New York (state)